Richard Sparcheford was an English priest in the first half of the 16th century.

Sparcheford  was  educated at the University of Oxford. He held livings at St Botolph-without-Bishopsgate in the City of London and St Mary the Great, v. He was a canon (priest) of St Paul's Cathedral; and Archdeacon of Shropshire ifrom 1536 until his death in 1560.

References

1560 deaths
Alumni of the University of Oxford
Archdeacons of Shropshire
16th-century English people
St Paul's Cathedral